Zaim Imamović (22 April 1961 – 9 October 1995) was a Bosniak soldier who commanded the Army of the Republic of Bosnia and Herzegovina forces in the Goražde enclave during the 1992–95 Bosnian War.

He was born in Ilovača, Goražde, SR Bosnia and Herzegovina, former SFR Yugoslavia. Prior to the war he was a professional soldier in the Yugoslav People's Army and held the rank of Captain.

When Yugoslavia began to fall apart Imamović was stationed in Slovenia but the beginning of the war in Bosnia found him in Sarajevo. He returned to his native region and took command of the soldiers there. 

His leadership skills were recognized and he was taken out of the enclave in order to command a unit which sought to break the siege from outside. He always led from the frontline and was wounded 5 times. Imamović was killed by shrapnel from a shell on the Treskavica mountain on 9 October 1995, just one day before the ceasefire leading to the final peace agreement.

He was buried on the grounds of the Ali Pasha Mosque in Sarajevo along other prominent Bosniak military and political leaders.

Imamović's son Ernest is a politician, member of the Social Democratic Party of Bosnia and Herzegovina and current mayor of Goražde, having served since 25 December 2020.

References

1961 births
1995 deaths
People from Goražde
Bosniaks of Bosnia and Herzegovina
Bosnia and Herzegovina Muslims
Army of the Republic of Bosnia and Herzegovina soldiers
Bosnia and Herzegovina military personnel killed in action
Officers of the Yugoslav People's Army